Amphibious (Persian: دوزیست‎, romanized: Dozist) is a 2020 Iranian drama film directed and written by Borzou Niknejad. The film screened for the first time at the 38th Fajr Film Festival.

Premise 
In the south of the city, a boy named Atta lives with his father and has sent two of his friends home. The maid who works for their neighbor has a special attachment to atta, but Atta doesn't know anything about it. The maid brings a girl to Atta's house and claims that she is her cousin, and asks Atta to keep her secretly in his house for a few days. Atta accepts this and the story begins when the girl enters the house.

Cast 
 Javad Ezzati as Atta
 Hadi Hejazifar as Hamid
Pejman Jamshidi as Mojtaba
 Setareh Pesyani as Azadeh
Mani Haghighi as Atta's neighbor
Saeed Poursamimi as Ebrahim, Atta's father
Elham Akhavan as Maryam
 Majid Norouzi

References

External links
 

2020s Persian-language films
2020 films
2020 drama films
Iranian drama films